The Symphony No. 2 in B-flat major, Op. 4, B. 12 was composed by Antonín Dvořák between August and October 1865. Dvořák sent the score to be bound, but could not pay the binder, who kept the score. A friend of his, with whom he was sharing lodgings, Moric Anger, lent Dvořák the money to pay off the binder and retrieve his score. Later, when Anger asked for repayment of the debt, Dvořák was again unable to pay, so Anger took the score as security and only returned it when Dvořák retracted a previous threat to destroy it, something Anger had always advised against.  In 1887 Dvořák revised the score, thinning out the rather dense orchestration.

It had its world premiere, and its sole performance during the composer's lifetime in March 1888, under Adolf Čech (who also premiered the 5th and 6th symphonies). It was generally well received.

Form

The work is in four movements:

Unusually, all of these movements begin with introductory material unrelated to the major theme. The introduction to the final movement contains a four-note motif that Dvorák would quote some thirty-five years later in his opera Rusalka.  Musicologist David R. Beveridge has concluded that this theme owes its origins to Dvorák's spurning by his pupil Josefina Cermakova, which occurred at approximately the time that Dvorák was writing this symphony and which the composer was prompted to recall by the plot of the opera.

A typical performance of the work has a duration of about 50 minutes.

Instrumentation
The work is scored for two flutes, piccolo, two oboes, two clarinets, two bassoons, four horns, two trumpets, three trombones, timpani, and strings.

References

External links
 Symphony No. 2 on a comprehensive Dvořák site
 
 Symphony No. 2 Free Scores at the International Music Score Library Project.

Symphony 002
1865 compositions
Compositions in B-flat major
Dvořák